Deborah Hankinson was a justice of the Supreme Court of Texas.

She was born on February 3, 1953. Hankinson earned a special education degree from the University of Texas at Dallas in 1977, and initially worked as an educator for children with developmental disabilities. She later received her J.D. degree from Southern Methodist University Dedman School of Law. In 1995, Hankinson was appointed as a judge of the Fifth District Court of Appeals located in Dallas, Texas. On October 28, 1997, she was appointed by Governor George W. Bush as a justice of the Supreme Court of Texas. Hankinson remained on the bench until December 31, 2002. She returned to private practice and founded her own appellate law firm in Dallas.

See also 

 List of justices of the Texas Supreme Court

References 

Justices of the Texas Supreme Court
American women judges
Lawyers from Dallas
University of Texas at Dallas alumni
Dedman School of Law alumni
1953 births
Living people
20th-century American lawyers
21st-century American lawyers
20th-century American women lawyers
21st-century American women lawyers
20th-century American women judges
20th-century American judges
21st-century women judges